rEFIt is a boot menu and maintenance toolkit for EFI-based machines like the Intel Macs. It can be used to boot multiple operating systems, including triple-boot setups with software such as Apple's Boot Camp Assistant. It also provides a way to enter and explore the EFI pre-boot environment. The name "rEFIt" is likely a play on the terms "refit" and "EFI".

Development on "rEFIt" was abandoned by Christoph Pfisterer in 2010. However, in 2012 the developer Roderick W. Smith forked is as a new project called rEFInd, which still has active development to this day.

References

External links 
 rEFIt
 rEFInd

Free boot loaders
Free system software
Macintosh firmware
Software using the BSD license